The Big Texan Steak Ranch is a steakhouse restaurant and motel located in Amarillo, Texas, United States, which opened on the previous U.S. Route 66 in the 4500 block of East Amarillo Boulevard in 1960. It relocated to its present location on Interstate 40 in 1970. Fire gutted the west wing of the restaurant in 1976 and destroyed $100,000 in antiques. The restaurant reopened as a larger facility in 1977.  The building is painted a bright yellow, with blue trim. A large bull statue advertises their "free" 72 oz. steak (see below). The now-closed Texas Tornado Museum resided off in a far corner of the parking lot on the property.

72oz Steak Challenge

The Big Texan is best known for its 72 ounce (4.5 pounds or 2.04 kg) steak.  The steak is free to anyone who, in one hour or less, can eat the entire meal, consisting of the steak itself, a bread roll with butter, a baked potato, shrimp cocktail, and a salad; otherwise, the meal costs $72. Those who have successfully consumed the 72oz steak challenge have their names recorded and posted at the restaurant. To date, over 10,000 people out of about 70,000 people who attempted this challenge have accomplished this feat.

According to the restaurant, when featured on the TV show Man v. Food, the challenge started in 1960, when founder Bob Lee decided to hold a contest over which of the cowboys working in the stockyards could eat the most steaks in one hour, with a prize of $5 at stake. One cowboy ate four and a half 1-pound steaks, a shrimp cocktail, a baked potato, a dinner roll, and a salad in the hour's time to win the $5. Lee was so impressed with the achievement that he declared, "Whoever eats that much again in my restaurant, he gets it for free." Those who take on the 72oz steak challenge are required to pay for the meal in advance and, if they are successful, their money is refunded.  The steak is cooked to the participant's preference, and the challenge takes place at a table for six on a raised platform in the middle of the main dining room.

The record for the shortest time to finish the entire 72oz steak challenge had been held by competitive eating champion Joey Chestnut (at 8 minutes and 52 seconds), breaking Frank Pastore's 1987 record (of 9 minutes 30 seconds, which stood for 21 years) on his March 24, 2008 visit. On May 26, 2014, he was bested by 125-pound competitive eater Molly Schuyler, who polished off the meal in just 4 minutes 58 seconds, and came back for seconds (14 minutes and 57 seconds for two meals). She did not, however, eat a third steak meal in the same hour. Schuyler returned on April 19, 2015 and would finish her first meal in 4 minutes 18 seconds, beating her own record by 40 seconds. She had defeated four other teams of competitors in the challenge, devouring two more meals in twenty minutes. The unofficial record (for all animals, including humans) was held by a 500-pound Siberian tiger who ate the steak in 90 seconds in 1999, until bested by a lioness in 2012 clocking in at 80 seconds.

In media

The 72oz Steak Challenge meal is shown in the movie Waking Up in Reno, with Billy Bob Thornton taking the challenge. It is also shown on the Travel Channel's Man v. Food, where host Adam Richman completes the challenge and in Anthony Bourdain: No Reservations, where Bourdain declines to compete but his cameraman takes part and fails.

The Big Texan Steak Ranch is known for its Cadillac white stretch limos with longhorn hood ornaments, one of which appears in the 2006 animated film Cars as Texas oil baron Tex Dinoco. Becky Ransom and the Big Texan Steak Ranch ("free 72-ounce steak if consumed in 60 minutes") are acknowledged in the film's credits.

In the Season 3 episode of King of the Hill "And They Call It Bobby Love", the Steak Ranch was parodied with a similar restaurant called the "Panhandler Steakhouse." Bobby Hill accepts the challenge only to spite the girl that spurned his affections (who was also a vegetarian). He completes the challenge but upon returning home subsequently vomits.

A billboard advertising the restaurant appears in a panel in George Takei's autobiographical graphic novel They Called us Enemy.

Big Texan Motel 
Located adjacent to the restaurant on The Big Texan Steak Ranch property is the 54-unit Big Texan Motel. The cinder-block construction motel is designed to resemble a main street in an old west town, and features Texas-themed decor and a Texas-shaped pool. In 2004, a 20-stall stable was added behind the main motel building.

See also
 List of motels
 List of steakhouses

References

External links 

Buildings and structures in Amarillo, Texas
Culture of Amarillo, Texas
Steakhouses in the United States
U.S. Route 66 in Texas
Roadside attractions in Texas
Landmarks in Amarillo, Texas
Restaurants in Texas
Tourist attractions along U.S. Route 66
Interstate 40
Tourist attractions in Amarillo, Texas
Restaurants established in 1960
Motels in the United States
1960 establishments in Texas